Jabriya  is in an area in Hawalli Governorate in Kuwait City, Kuwait. It is a large, mainly residential area that borders Surra, Hawalli, Salmiya and Bayan. Jabriya has seen an increase of commercial activities in recent years.

On 31 December 2007, Jabriya's population was estimated to be 66,056

Mubarak Al-Kabeer Hospital, one of the six public hospitals in Kuwait, was built there in 1982. Other organisations within the area include the Kuwait Medical Association (KMA) and the Kuwait Central Blood Bank.

Jabriya is divided into twelve blocks with two blocks, 1 and 3, sectioned into A and B parts. Jabriya contains more than ten schools, a large number for its size, including New English School, The English Academy, Bayan Bilingual School and Fajr Al Sabah. Jabriya has many foreign workers.

Like other parts of Kuwait City, Jabriya has traffic problems, but even more serious. Jabriya is also well known for its relative safety and diversity.

Houses in Jabriya are between 2 and 4 storeys tall. From Jabriya, one can access the Fahaheel Expressway which leads to Bayan, Salwa, Rumaithiya and Abu Halifa.

Landmarks
 Husainiyat Al-Bulush (largest hussainia in Jabriya)
 Mubarak Al-Kabeer Hospital  named after Shiekh Mubarak Al-Kabeer Al-Sabah. It serves the Hawalli Governorate and covers about 700,000 people in the area.
 Hadi Hospital
 Health Science Center and Faculty of Medicine
 Kuwait Central Blood Bank

Museums
 Tariq Rajab Museum opened in 1980
 Dar El CID

Mosques
Al-Bulush Mosque
Al Mawash Mosque
Al Qatan Mosque, built in 1987
Modi Abdullatif Al-Othman Mosque, built in 1984
Mohammed Taleb Al Kandari Mosque
Mubarak Al Kabeer Mosque

Embassies in Jabriya 
A number of embassies are located in Jabriya:
 Armenia
 Bulgaria
 Jordan
 Netherlands
 Pakistan
 Philippines
 Poland
 Serbia
 Swaziland
 Thailand
 Vietnam
 Yemen

References

Suburbs of Kuwait City
Areas of Hawalli Governorate